Bastiansen is a surname. Notable people with the surname include:

Anders Bastiansen (born 1980), Norwegian ice hockey forward player
Henrik G. Bastiansen (born 1964), Norwegian historian 
Peter Bastiansen (politician) (1912–1995), Norwegian businessman and politician 
Peter Bastiansen (tennis) (born 1962), Danish tennis player